Tamta is the first studio album by Greek pop singer and Super Idol contestant Tamta. It was released in 2006 by Minos EMI.

Track listing
"Tornero – Tromero" (featuring Mihai Traistariu) (Repackaged Edition Only) – 3:00
"Den Telionei Etsi I Agapi" – 3:17
"Ftais" (Faraway) – 3:19
"Mi Fovase" – 3:19
"Einai Krima" (featuring Grigoris Petrakos) – 3:19
"O,ti Telionei Pona" – 3:35
"Ipervoles" – 3:06
"Tora Pos Na Sviso" – 4:22
"Mi Mou Zitas Na Xehaso" (Je N' Oublie Rien) – 4:01
"Ti Sou Ftaio Ego Pou Toso S'agapo" – 3:29
"Den S' Afino" – 3:50

Tamta albums
Greek-language albums
2006 debut albums
Minos EMI albums